Lionel Blair (born Henry Lionel Ogus; 12 December 1928 – 4 November 2021) was a Canadian-born British actor, choreographer, tap dancer, and television presenter. From the late 1960s until the early 1980s, he made regular appearances as a dancer and entertainer on British television. He also presented the quiz programme Name That Tune, and was a team captain on the televised charades gameshow Give Us a Clue.

Early life
Henry Lionel Ogus was born in Montreal, Quebec, Canada. He was born to Jewish parents, Myer Ogus and Debora "Della" Greenbaum. His father, a barber, emigrated from Russia to Canada to start a new life, and his wife joined him shortly afterwards.  

Blair came to Britain when he was two years old, and the family settled at Stamford Hill in north London, where his father continued to work as a barber. Although his parents were Jewish they were not orthodox; they would eat chicken on a Friday night, but also ate bacon. Due to the anti-semitism of the time, his father changed the family name to Blair. 

His first public performances were with his sister Joyce (1932–2006) in the Manor House Underground station air raid shelters and on the trains of the Piccadilly line during the air raids of the Second World War. During the Blitz, mother and children were evacuated to Oxford, but when they saw a German plane crash from the back garden, the family decided they might as well be in London. When Blair was thirteen, his father died after what should have been a routine operation on an ulcer. After this, Blair became the breadwinner for the family and took to the stage. He started out with girlish parts, as his voice had not yet broken.

Blair was singled out in several reviews for his performance as one of the children in a touring performance of the play Watch on the Rhine during 1943, and attended the Royal Shakespeare Theatre in Stratford in 1944. In 1946, he joined a touring company called the Savoy Players.

Blair eventually rekindled his passion for musical theatre and began working in the West End. He gave up acting for dancing in 1947, although he subsequently appeared in  a national tour of Who Killed Agatha Christie.  He took his stage name around this time, later changing it by deed poll just before he married in 1967; his sister also decided to use the same surname professionally.

Before his break into television, Blair had played juvenile lead in The Five Past Eight Show at the Alhambra Theatre, Glasgow, where he played straight man to many Scottish comedians, including Jimmy Logan and Rikki Fulton. Blair later said: "They were very funny, but they were also brilliant actors, and I learnt everything I needed to from them." By the mid-1950s he was choreographing shows at the Alhambra which were considered stylish and were hugely popular.

Career

Blair came to the fore in the 1960s when, with his dance troupe, he appeared on television variety programmes. He also appeared in the films The Limping Man (1953), The World of Suzie Wong (1960), The Cool Mikado (1963), The Beauty Jungle (1964), A Hard Day's Night (1964), Maroc 7 (1967) and Absolute Beginners (1986), cameoed in an episode of The Persuaders!, and appeared in television comedy, including the short film, The Plank. In addition, he choreographed films such as Jazz Boat (1960), in which he made an uncredited appearance, and The Magic Christian (1969). He appeared in Miss World 1969 and 1970 at the Royal Albert Hall in London.

Blair was one of the team captains on the game show Give Us a Clue from 1979 until the early 1990s, and was the second presenter of the British version of Name That Tune in the 1980s. 

In 1980, he made a small contribution to the children's music album Captain Beaky and His Band. In 1983, he appeared as the celebrity dart player for charity on Bullseye. He published his autobiography Stagestruck in 1985. In 2005, he took part in the Channel Five reality series, The Farm. Until 2005, he appeared extensively in pantomime, for which he earned up to £15,000 a week.

In 1988, Blair made an appearance in aid of charity on the British television game show Catchphrase, hosted by Irish comedian Roy Walker. Other celebrities also appeared alongside Blair, including radio DJ Chris Tarrant.

In 1993, Blair appeared as himself in an episode of Birds of a Feather.

In 2003, Blair released his first full-length album as a singer, in a tribute to Fred Astaire titled Blair Sings Astaire, together with the Jive Aces.

He took part in the 2007 Christmas special of the Ricky Gervais show Extras, as himself, portraying the end-stages of his showbiz career by trying to keep up his profile by appearing on Celebrity Big Brother.

In 2009, twenty-one years after Chris Rea's "Driving Home for Christmas" was first released, Blair starred in an original video for the song that was made in aid of Shelter. All proceeds from the digital download were donated to the charity.

In July 2010, Blair appeared in the "Great British Dog Walks" feature on ITV's This Morning with his dog Lola. The same year, he took part in the BBC's The Young Ones, in which six celebrities in their seventies and eighties attempted to overcome some of the problems of ageing by harking back to the 1970s. 

In December 2010, he appeared briefly in a sketch with Ronnie Corbett and Rob Brydon in BBC One's The One Ronnie. On 24 December 2011, he appeared on the ITV programme Text Santa with Ant & Dec. In 2012, he was cast in the film version of Ray Cooney's farce Run for Your Wife. On 3 January 2014, he entered the Celebrity Big Brother house with Made in Chelsea media personality Ollie Locke, after being handcuffed together as part of a task set by Big Brother. He became the third housemate to be evicted on 17 January 2014.

Blair continued to work as an actor, having filmed an episode of BBC One's medical soap opera Doctors in 2014. 

He appeared in the British short film Evil's Evil Cousin in 2016. On 14 December that year, he guested on the ITV panel show, Loose Women, to announce and celebrate his recent 88th birthday. The panellists presented him with a personalised cake. In 2017, Blair was one of the celebrities appearing in the second series of the BBC reality series The Real Marigold Hotel. 

In 2018, he joined 26 other celebrities at Metropolis Studios, to perform an original Christmas song called "Rock with Rudolph", a song written and produced by Grahame and Jack Corbyn. The song was recorded in aid of Great Ormond Street Hospital and was released digitally by the independent record label Saga Entertainment on 30 November 2018 under the artist name the Celebs. The music video debuted exclusively with The Sun on 29 November 2018, and had its first TV showing on Good Morning Britain on 30 November 2018. Blair appeared on Loose Women on 13 December to help promote the single and celebrate his 90th birthday. The song peaked at number two on the iTunes pop chart.

In 2019, he received the honour of being named "Oldie of the Year" at the annual awards promoted by The Oldie magazine.

Blair found working on pantomime particularly lucrative and reported that he could earn £100,000 for a six-week run.

Blair, and his incorrectly assumed homosexuality, was a recurring joke on the long-running BBC Radio 4 series I'm Sorry I Haven't a Clue. The constant jibes upset his family and his children were bullied at school as a result.

Personal life
Blair married Susan Davis at Kensington Register Office on 21 March 1967, with Bernie Winters as best man. They had three children and three grandchildren and celebrated their 50th wedding anniversary on 21 March 2017. The couple lived in Banstead, Surrey.

On 21 September 2006, Blair and comedian Alan Carr helped save a man about to fall from a pier in Blackpool. The man was holding on by his fingers.

Death
Blair died on the morning of 4 November 2021, at the age of 92.

Books

References

External links
Blair chooses Sammy Davis Jr on BBC Radio 4's "Great Lives"

 Lionel Blair at BFI
Blair's appearance with dog Lola on ITV1's "This Morning" show
 Lionel Blair obituary at The Guardian
 Lionel Blair, veteran dancer, actor and choreographer who became a television institution on Give Us a Clue – obituary at The Daily Telegraph

1928 births
2021 deaths
Anglophone Quebec people
Canadian emigrants to England
English choreographers
English Jews
English male film actors
English male television actors
English people of Russian-Jewish descent
English television presenters
Male actors from Montreal
Canadian people of Russian-Jewish descent
Male actors from London
Jewish actors
Tap dancers